Samantha Rae Steckloff (born  1984) is an American politician serving as a member of the Michigan House of Representatives from the 37th district. Elected in 2020, she assumed office on January 1, 2021. Prior to that, Steckloff served 8 years on the Farmington Hills City Council.

Early life and education
Steckloff was born around 1984 in Farmington Hills, Michigan to mother Vicki Barnett. Steckloff graduated from Farmington Public Schools. As a teenager, Steckloff got involved with community activism through the Farmington Hills After School program and as a charter member of the Mayor's Youth Council. In 2006, Steckloff earned a bachelor's degree in foreign policy from Purdue University. During her time at Purdue University, Steckloff became the Indiana Association of Cities and Towns' youngest youth coordinator.

Career
Steckloff was first elected to the Farmington Hills City Council in 2013. During her time on the council, she successfully advocated for the creation of a city community health commission, the first of its kind in Michigan. On November 3, 2020, Steckloff was elected to the Michigan House of Representatives, where she has represented the 37th district since January 1, 2021. She resigned from the city council to serve in the state legislature.

In the Michigan House, Steckloff serves on the Appropriations Committee and is Vice-Chair of the Transportation Subcommittee. She also is a member of the Joint Capital Outlay and Licensing & Regulatory Affairs/Insurance & Financial Services Subcommittee of the Appropriations Committee.

Personal life
In 2015, Steckloff was diagnosed with invasive ductal carcinoma, the most common form of breast cancer. Due to the diagnosis, Steckloff experienced bouts of depression and suicidal thoughts. Her experiences were featured in the 2016 Public Broadcasting Service documentary Death Is Not the Answer. In September 2020, Steckloff married Brandon Sundheimer. Steckloff is Jewish.

References

Living people
1980s births
Jewish American state legislators in Michigan
Democratic Party members of the Michigan House of Representatives
People from Farmington Hills, Michigan
Purdue University alumni
Women city councillors in Michigan
Women state legislators in Michigan
21st-century American women politicians
21st-century American politicians
21st-century American Jews